The Knewz is a polka band based in Buffalo, New York, which was started in 1990 by Mike Burka, Tom Picciano, and Tommy Wanderlich.  The band plays many original songs, covers of country and rock songs, and also traditional Polish polkas, obereks, and waltzes.

In 2008, The Knewz received two awards from the United States Polka Association: Favorite Recording of the Year, Headlinez, and Favorite Song of the Year, "When I Call Your Name", written by Tommy Wanderlich. Occasionally, fans of the band would bring cue cards with the words to songs on them as Wanderlich would often forget the lyrics. This is believed to have been started by Wisconsin native, Debbie Dunaj.

Recordings

Touring 

Throughout their existence The Knewz has toured most of the northeast and midwestern states. They’ve developed followings in New York, Massachusetts, Pennsylvania, New Jersey, Ohio, Michigan, Illinois and Wisconsin. They’re also a regular booking for most of the major polka festivals held in the U.S. They’ve also performed internationally as the band has participated in several polka cruises that have traveled to Mexico, several countries in Central America and the Caribbean.

Members 
Andy Bojczuk - drums, vocals
John Fomenko - accordion
Tom Picciano - trumpet, clarinet, vocals
Brian Urbanczyk - bass guitar
Jimmy Weber - clarinet, vocals
John Zelasko - trumpet, concertina, accordion, vocals

Past members 
Mike Burka - trumpet, vocals
Tommy Wanderlich - concertina, clarinet, saxophone, vocals

Discography

External links 
The Knewz

American polka groups